Walter Lee Gaines (17 March 1881 – 20 November 1950) was a pioneer of dairy science and a professor of milk production at the University of Illinois. He studied factors affecting hormonal injections and their induction of milk production. In 1915 he used a pituitary gland extract from goats to demonstrate the effect, and it was later identified that the hormone was oxytocin. He noted that anaesthetic prevented this hormone from being effective and Gaines was among the first to suggest the idea of a neuroendocrine reflex involving the production of the substance in response to suckling. He was also thus a pioneer of neuroendocrinology.

Gaines was born in Crete, Illinois and went to the University of Illinois, receiving a BS (1908) and an MS (1910) before continuing on work towards PhD on the physiology of lactation. His 1915 thesis work on the induction of milk flow by hormones through injections and the observation that this induction is prevented by anaesthesia made him suggest a connection between neural stimulation of the endocrine system. He became a professor of milk production in 1919 and was involved in dairy research including studies on the effect of hormone, milk constitution and devised an approach to standardization of the energy content in milk.

References

External links 
 University of Illinois digital reprints

1881 births
1950 deaths
University of Illinois alumni
University of Illinois faculty
People from Crete, Illinois
American endocrinologists